Eli Falkvard Nielsen (born 23 September 1992) is a Faroese footballer who plays as a midfielder for B36 Tórshavn and the Faroe Islands national team.

Career
Nielsen made his international debut for the Faroe Islands on 12 October 2019 in a UEFA Euro 2020 qualifying match against Romania, which finished as a 0–3 home loss.

Career statistics

International

References

External links
 
 
 

1992 births
Living people
Faroese footballers
Faroe Islands youth international footballers
Faroe Islands under-21 international footballers
Faroe Islands international footballers
Association football midfielders
Havnar Bóltfelag players
B36 Tórshavn players
Faroe Islands Premier League players